"Move Shake Drop" is a song by American disc jockey DJ Laz, released as the first single from his 2008 studio album Category 6. It featured vocals from fellow Americans Flo Rida, Casely and Pitbull. The backing track was composed by production duo the Diaz Brothers, who helped to write the song alongside DJ Laz and Pitbull.

Composition 
The song samples the synth hook of Benny Benassi's track "Satisfaction", used as the main basis for the song. Following some disputes, another version with a similar but different melody in the hook was also produced.

Chart performance 
"Move Shake Drop" became DJ Laz's first song to appear on the US Billboard Hot 100, enterting the chart at number 86 and peaking at number 56, spending a total of five weeks on the chart. On the US Latin Songs and Rhythmic Top 40 charts, the song reached numbers 49 and 40 respectively; it also spent twelve weeks on the now defunct US Pop 100 chart, entering at number 97 and peaking at 42.

In the Philippines, it was a certified smash hit, and became a staple music of various dance competitions and showdowns in the country.

Charts

Release history

References

2007 songs
2008 singles
Flo Rida songs
Pitbull (rapper) songs
Songs written by Pitbull (rapper)